Sphagnum subfulvum is a species of moss belonging to the family Sphagnaceae.

It is native to Northern Hemisphere.

References

subfulvum